Slaven's Cabin, also called Slaven's Roadhouse and Frank Slaven Roadhouse, is a public-use facility in the Yukon-Charley Rivers National Preserve in Alaska. It is listed on the National Register of Historic Places.

Miner Frank Slaven began excavations at nearby Coal Creek in 1905 and built the roadhouse in 1932 with several friends. The roadhouse was used until the 1950s and was listed on the National Register of Historic Places in 1987. It also is included in the Coal Creek Historic Mining District, which is itself listed on the National Register of Historic Places. The cabin was restored in 1993 for use as a visitor contact area and public use facility. A separate public-use cabin also was built in 1993 at the location.

It is a two-story cabin built of  hewn spruce logs. This portion was later enclosed.

The complex also is an official "dog drop" along the 1,000 mile Yukon Quest International Sled Dog Race route.

See also 
National Register of Historic Places listings in Yukon-Charley Rivers National Preserve
National Register of Historic Places listings in Yukon-Koyukuk Census Area, Alaska

References

External links

 Public Use Cabins
 Historic Slaven’s Roadhouse proves popular with mushers, rangers

1932 establishments in Alaska
National Register of Historic Places in Yukon-Charley Rivers National Preserve
Commercial buildings completed in 1932
Log cabins in the United States
Yukon Quest
Yukon River
Log buildings and structures on the National Register of Historic Places in Alaska
Buildings and structures on the National Register of Historic Places in Yukon–Koyukuk Census Area, Alaska